Hayley Padget (born 30 September 1992) is an Australian field hockey player.

Personal life
Hayley Padget was born in Doncaster, Victoria, and plays representative hockey for the Victorian Vipers.

Padget is also a scholarship holder at the Victorian Institute of Sport.

Career

Junior National Team
Padget made her debut for the Australia U–21 team during a Four Nations Tournament in New Delhi. 

In 2013, Padget was a member of the junior national team at the Australian Youth Olympic Festival, where the team won gold for the first time.

Senior National Team
Padget made her international debut at the 2018 Sompo Cup  in Ibaraki, Japan, scoring a goal on debut. 

As of May 2018, Padget is a member of the Australian women's national development squad.

References

External links
 
 
 

1992 births
Living people
Australian female field hockey players
Female field hockey midfielders
Field hockey players from Melbourne
Sportswomen from Victoria (Australia)
People from Doncaster, Victoria
21st-century Australian women